Neohesperilla croceus, the crocea skipper, is a butterfly of the family Hesperiidae. It is found in New Guinea and in coastal paperbark swamps in Australia in the Northern Territory and Queensland.

The wingspan is about 30 mm.

The larvae feed on various grasses, including Chrysopogon aciculatus and Schizachyrium pachyarthron.

External links
 Australian Caterpillars

Trapezitinae
Butterflies described in 1889
Butterflies of Australia